Ishak Ali Moussa (born 27 December 1970) is an Algerian former professional footballer who played as a forward.

Honours
CR Belouizdad
 Algerian league: 2000, 2001
 Algerian Cup: 1995
 Algerian League Cup: 2000

References

External links
 DZFoot.com Profile
 
 

1970 births
Living people
Algerian footballers
Association football forwards
Algeria international footballers
1998 African Cup of Nations players
Algerian Ligue Professionnelle 1 players
USMM Hadjout players
CR Belouizdad players
OMR El Annasser players
WR Bentalha players
21st-century Algerian people